The 2014 Judo Grand Slam Baku was held in Baku, Azerbaijan, from 9 to 11 May 2014.

Medal summary

Men's events

Women's events

Source Results

Medal table

References

External links
 

2014 IJF World Tour
2014 Judo Grand Slam
Judo
Grand Slam Baku 2014
Judo
Judo